Eritrea competed at the 2012 Winter Youth Olympics in Innsbruck, Austria. The Eritrean team was made up of one athlete, a Canadian born alpine skier. This marked Eritrea's debut at a Winter Olympics.

Alpine skiing

Eritrea qualified one boy in alpine skiing.

Boy

See also

Eritrea at the 2012 Summer Olympics

References

Nations at the 2012 Winter Youth Olympics
Oly
Eritrea at the Youth Olympics